Scott Brewer is a former North Carolina District Court judge who also served as a North Carolina House of Representatives member. He was appointed to the legislature on May 1, 2019, to complete the unexpired term of Ken Goodman, who accepted an appointment from Governor Roy Cooper to serve on the state Industrial Commission. Brewer represented House District 66 (Montgomery, Richmond and Stanly counties) from 2019 until 2021. In 2020 Brewer ran for re-election to a full term, but he was defeated by Republican Ben Moss.

According to a news article, Brewer grew up in Durham and received his Bachelor of Arts degree from the University of North Carolina at Chapel Hill and his law degree from Campbell University. He worked in the district attorney’s office and as a district court judge for Judicial District 20A (which covers Richmond, Anson, and Stanly counties) from late 1987 until 2014. He was  chief district court judge for Judicial District 20A and later 16A (Richmond, Anson, Scotland, and Hoke counties) from 2015 until his retirement in November 2018. He opened a private law office in Rockingham in March 2019.

Electoral history

2020

References

Living people
21st-century American politicians
Democratic Party members of the North Carolina House of Representatives
Year of birth missing (living people)